The 1980 NCAA Division III baseball tournament was played at the end of the 1980 NCAA Division III baseball season to determine the fifth national champion of college baseball at the NCAA Division III level. The tournament concluded with four teams competing at Pioneer Park in Marietta, Ohio, for the championship. Four regional tournaments were held to determine the participants in the World Series. Regional tournaments were contested in double-elimination format, with all four regions consisting of six teams, for a total of 24 teams participating in the tournament.

Bids
The 24 competing teams were:

Regionals

South Regional

Northeast Regional

Mideast Regional

West Regional

World Series

Participants

Bracket
Pioneer Park-Marietta, OH (Host: Marietta College)

See also
 1980 NCAA Division I baseball tournament
 1980 NCAA Division II baseball tournament
 1980 NAIA World Series

References

NCAA Division III Baseball Tournament
Tournament